Patrick Casey (or Pat or Paddy) may refer to:

 Patrick Casey (bishop of Brentwood) (Patrick Joseph Casey, 1913–1999), English bishop
 Patrick Casey (bishop of Ross, Ireland), Irish Roman Catholic bishop
 Patrick Casey (rugby union) (Patrick Joseph Casey, born 1941), Irish rugby union player
 Patrick Casey (runner) (born 1990), American middle-distance runner
 Patrick Casey (writer) (born 1978), American writer and actor
 Pat Casey (baseball) (born 1959), American baseball coach
 Pat Casey (politician) (born 1961/2), Irish politician
 Paddy Casey, Irish musician
 Patrick Casey (white supremacist) (born 1989), American nationalist
 Patrick J. Casey, American biochemist and molecular pharmacologist